The Unity State gubernatorial election took place on 11–15 April 2010, alongside the wider Sudanese general election, to elect the Governor of Unity State. Incumbent Governor Taban Deng Gai was re-elected, defeating 6 other candidates, including Angelina Teny, who had resigned from the SPLM in order to contest the election.

Following the election the defeated candidates issued a joint statement denouncing the results, alleging the election had involved severe vote-rigging, and called for a review by the National Elections Commission. Angelina Teny said she would not accept or recognize the results.
Angelina Teny detailed many irregularities, including ejection of observers, missing ballot boxes, vote counts in excess of the number of registered voters and so on.
Her campaign leader was arrested when he and members of his team tried to enter the State High Elections Committee's office.
Police shot dead two people and four others were injured when police opened fire on a crowd of protesters in the state capital, Bentiu. 
Angelina Teny called on her supporters to be calm and avoid violence, which has been endemic in Unity State, the main oil-producing area in South Sudan.

Results

References

http://www.sudantribune.com/spip.php?page=imprimable&id_article=34880

http://www.smallarmssurveysudan.org/fileadmin/docs/facts-figures/south-sudan/armed-groups/southern-dissident-militias/HSBA-Armed-Groups-Gai.pdf

Gubernatorial elections in Sudan